Two teenaged males entered a classroom on 15 January 2018, in the Motovilikhinsky District in Perm, Russia wielding knives and injured eleven students and one teacher. The teacher was attacked after attempting to subdue them.

Incident 
Reports initially stated that two masked men had burst into the school and attacked students, but authorities later clarified that the incident began as a fight between two students.

A security source told reporters that prior to entering the classroom, the two teenagers had engaged in a knife fight in the hallway, and a local source identified one of the boys as a past student who had been expelled while the other was a current student at the school. The fight was then reported to have moved into a classroom in which the teacher and several students attempted to subdue them. The Russian Ombudsman for children, released a statement that said; "Fourth year pupils were protecting their teacher who was trying to stop older guys fighting with knives."

Police and ambulances were called at 10:20 am local time (00:20 am ET). The school was later evacuated.

Victims 
The teacher and the two perpetrators were admitted to the hospital in critical condition. Twelve other victims were reported to have been transported to a local children's hospital, and nine children received "superficial injuries".

Perpetrators 
The two perpetrators were arrested and a criminal case was opened on both on charges of attempted murder of two or more people, including minors, committed by a group of individuals with prior agreement.

Investigation 
The Russian Ombudsman raised concerns about the incident, and declared "We will figure out how armed guys made it to school and who did not respond to the situation at the site. Was there really no-one apart from ten-year-old children who could stop the hooligans. What about the school guards?"

After the incident an account on the Russian social network VK, that is believed to be connected to one of the perpetrators was discovered to have posted a video of American High School shooters, including Columbine High School massacre perpetrators Eric Harris and Dylan Klebold. The account was also connected to a group called (school)shooters and an account under the name of the other perpetrator referenced Slenderman.

References 

2018 crimes in Russia
January 2018 crimes in Europe
Knife attacks
Perm, Russia
January 2018 events in Russia
Stabbing attacks in 2018
Mass stabbings in Europe